Jack Anthony Charles William Sowerby (born 23 March 1995) is an English professional footballer who plays as a midfielder for League Two club Northampton Town.

Career
Sowerby played youth team football for Preston North End, joining North West Counties League side Squires Gate in 2013. After impressing on a trial basis, he signed with League One side Fleetwood Town in November 2014. He made his debut in the Football League on 22 August 2015, coming on as a late substitute for Antoni Sarcevic in a 4–0 win over Colchester United at Highbury Stadium. He scored his first goal for Fleetwood in a 2–0 win over Peterborough United on 15 October 2016.

Fleetwood exercised a one-year contract extension for him at the end of the 2017–18 season.

Career statistics

References

External links

1995 births
Living people
Footballers from Preston, Lancashire
English footballers
Association football forwards
Preston North End F.C. players
Squires Gate F.C. players
Fleetwood Town F.C. players
Northampton Town F.C. players
English Football League players